This is a list of municipalities in the Colombian department of Antioquia.

References
 Government of Antioquia official website

Antioquia
Municipalities of Antioquia Department